Sree Sastha Institute of Engineering and Technology (SSIET) at Chembarambakkam, on the Chennai - Bangalore Highway, Tamil Nadu, India, is a private self-financing engineering institute. The college is approved by AICTE and is affiliated to the Anna University. The college was established on 9 September 1999.

Academics
SSIET offers seven courses leading to the Degree of Bachelor of Engineering (B.E.), two courses leading to Bachelor of Technology (B.Tech.) and eight post graduate programmes.

Academics Departments of Sree Sastha Institute of Engineering and Technology 

1.  Mechanical Engineering

2.  Electronics & Communication Engineering

3.  Electrical and Electronics Engineering

4.  Computer Science and Engineering

5. M.E. (Applied Electronics).

Admission
The Undergraduate students are admitted based on their 12th standard (higher secondary school) scores. The admissions are done as per the Government of Tamil Nadu norms through State Government Counselling (TNEA)and through regulated management seat procedures.

References

All India Council for Technical Education
Engineering colleges in Chennai
Colleges affiliated to Anna University
Educational institutions established in 1999
1999 establishments in Tamil Nadu